The Ain es Saheb airstrike occurred on 5 October 2003 and was the first overt Israeli military operation in Syria since the 1973 Yom Kippur War.

Operation 
A single civilian guard was reportedly injured in the strike, the first in Syrian territory in nearly thirty years. The jets took off from Ramat David Airbase at 03:00 and headed north over the Mediterranean before turning east, crossing the coastline into Lebanon and approaching the target from the west. It is uncertain whether the aircraft actually crossed the border into Syria proper as the exact type of munitions used is unknown and the target is located close to the Syrian-Lebanese border.

Militant camp claims 
The Israel Defense Forces (IDF) claimed the camp was used to train recruits in bomb assembly and guerrilla warfare and has released footage of the camp taken from the Al-Arabia TV station showing hundreds of weapons and tunnels packed with arms and ammunition. Both Syria and the Islamic Jihad denied Israeli claims, while an official of Popular Front for the Liberation of Palestine General Command (PFLP-GC) said the camp belongs to his group but has been long abandoned. Palestinian sources in Beirut, however, report the facility belongs to the Popular Front for the Liberation of Palestine (PFLP, not to be mistaken with the PFLP-GC) and had at the same time served as a training base for the Islamic Jihad and Hamas. These same sources reported a weapons workshop at the site, lending support to reports by the attacking pilots of secondary explosions.

See also
Operation Orchard
2008 Abu Kamal raid
2019 Balakot airstrike

References

External links 
IAF Operations During The Al-Aqsa Intifada
Satellite Imagery of the target

Conflicts in 2003
Battles involving Israel
Arab–Israeli conflict
2003 in Israel
Airstrikes conducted by Israel
2003 in Syria
Israel–Syria military relations
Counterterrorism in Israel
Cross-border operations
Battles and conflicts without fatalities
Attacks in Syria in 2003
October 2003 events in Asia